"Know Your Enemy" is a song by American rock band Rage Against the Machine. It features Tool vocalist Maynard James Keenan on vocals during the bridge section, and Jane's Addiction drummer Stephen Perkins playing additional percussion.  Allmusic describes the song as "immediately memorable" and "surprisingly straightforward" while music critic Joel McIver cited it as "a standout track" of the album.

Composition

The song is in common time. The song's intro, in a moderate tempo of 84 BPM, makes use of Tom Morello's toggle switch, switching his pickups on and off to create a tremolo effect. Morello's effect is to imitate 70s classic rock synthesizer sounds. This is accompanied by Tim Commerford's slap bass, making this the only other track on the album to use the technique besides "Take the Power Back."  After this, it starts up in a faster, punk-ish riff at a tempo of 114.  This then leads into the verse, another fast paced riff centered upon the bass. Both the main and secondary riffs were written by Commerford on an acoustic bass. The song is in the key of F# minor. The chorus then returns to the original riff again, and then returns to the verse. Then, the song goes into a slower, 4/4 beat with palm muted guitar, background percussion by Stephen Perkins of Jane's Addiction and the trance-like vocals of Maynard James Keenan ("I've got no patience now/so sick of complacence now/sick of you/time has come to pay"). Perry Farrell was asked to sing the part but his absence led to it being given to former Rage lead vocalist candidate Keenan instead. All is brought to an end by Tom Morello's guitar solo using the DigiTech Whammy pedal harmonizer setting (as opposed to the pitch shifter setting used during the solo of "Killing in the Name") and toggle switch until the tempo slows down dramatically with a false ending. The guitar chord dissolves on a sludgy note resemblant of the intro to Black Sabbath's "Iron Man". It goes back to the verse riff with Zack speaking the line "All of which are American dreams" eight times, finishing well after the band stops playing.

Album vs demo
The album version is not the same as the demo version. The original is over 30 seconds shorter with no singing, uses distortion under the guitar solo without any 32nd notes or whammy pedal, and is notable for the misspelling of "defiance" as D-E-F-I-E-N-C-E. There is also an alternate drum breakdown and the "Compromise..Conformity.." section is not present with the song ending on an additional rant.

Political statements
The song, like many others in the album, contains anti-war and anti-authoritarian lyrics. The song's main message is that the American government is contradictory when it touts itself as the land of the free yet is run by an elitist enterprise, and that you should question authority figures who determine what you are able to believe. That message is evident in lines such as, "What? The land of the free? Whoever told you that is your enemy!", "As we move into '92, still in a room without a view!" and "Yes I know my enemies! They're the teachers that taught me to fight me!" The song ends with the following lines:

References

Rage Against the Machine songs
1992 songs
Anti-war songs
Political songs
Song recordings produced by Garth Richardson
Songs written by Zack de la Rocha
Songs written by Tim Commerford
Songs written by Tom Morello
Songs written by Brad Wilk